In continental philosophy, the Real refers to the remainder of reality that cannot be expressed, and which surpasses reasoning. In Lacanianism, it is an "impossible" category because of its opposition to expression and inconceivability.

In human geography and depth psychology

The Real is the intelligible form of the horizon of truth of the field-of-objects that has been disclosed. As the Real Order of the Borromean knot in Lacanianism, it is opposed in the unconscious to the Symbolic, which encompasses fantasy, dreams and hallucinations. In depth psychology and human geography, the Real can be described as a "negative space", analogous to a "black hole", a philosophical void of sociality and subjectivity, a traumatic consensus of intersubjectivity, or as an absolute noumenalness between signifiers. Lewis states that the Real can be a presence or is a substance and cites Derrida's claim that the real is authenticity.

Jacques Lacan defines the Real as a plenum, a nature beyond culture that is contradistinct from the ontic. The Lacanian real is a section of the triadic, Borromean knot: the Imaginary, the Symbolic, and the Real; the center of the knot is the sinthome (monad-soul).

Discourse of the subject

A master signifier (S1) organizes narrative (S2): a defensive form of discourse that is an ideological reaction to the Real: i.e., mythic explanation, hero's journey, storytelling, theme, pathos, ethos, plot, conflict, closure. The real subject (as id) is repressed (via aphanisis) by the imaginary-signified ego's ideologizing overtop of the real instincts. Narrative speech (parole) is an attempt to resolve the Real-Imaginary aporia (langue) concerning events.

Hurst states that, in principle, self-analysis (analyst's discourse) might prevent an analyst from retrogressing to the ideological position of the master's discourse (i.e., King in The Purloined Letter).

The phallic signifier and castration

The ineffable, unary signifier of lack (phallus) stitches the unconscious drives to jouissance, dialectically bridging language and desire (logos and eros, the Apollonian and the Dionysian).

Drives

Barthes reflects that the inner voice of the subject is structured in a triad of "Presence" (frustration) created by the maternal Other, "Intermittence" (castration anxiety) over the loss of the phallus as an imaginary object taken by the real father, and "Absence" (privation) that occurs from losing the phallus from the imaginary father; (symbolic desire separates from real need and becomes imaginary demand) (q.v., Lacan's graph of desire).

In neurosis

Hurst argues that the Lacanian Real parallels Derrida's concept of différance. Lewis states that lalangue is the arche-writing repetition that reveals the real subject through différance.  Guattari states that temporal différance is secreted from obsessional neurosis.

Hysteric's discourse

The hysteric's discourse is driven by the Real, where object (a) is at an impossible-to-find truth. Neither individuation nor differentiation can happen in the stagnancy of the Real.

The three categories of hysteria — conversion hysteria, anxiety hysteria, and traumatic hysteria — have a basis in alienation, with an identification to those-without-the-phallus, and a self-sacrifice through displacement. Hurst states that masculine libidinal hysteria breaches the paranoid-schizoid position of masculine fanaticism by attempting to make the Real appear, whereas feminine libidinal hysteria breaches the Nietzschean radical nihilism of Hegel's "eternal irony" by resisting the Symbolic Order.

Artistic discourse

Artistic discourse is a pneuma of neurosis-psychosis hallucinatory hysteria, a poetic-real microcosm of the True-Real.

Signs of the real

Tuché is an Aristotelian-borrowed term to describe the traumatic encounter-kernel of the Real and automaton to describe the repetitive transference process of symbolizing the Real.

The Symbolic introduces "a cut in the Real" in the process of signification: "it is the world of words that creates the world of things." Thus the Real emerges as that which is outside language, making it "that which resists symbolization absolutely". The logos of the Symbolic creates the Order of the Real; the Real and kairos divide the logos, resist symbolization, and anticipate being symbolized.

Signifiers of this experience are Lacan's jouissance, Marx's theory of alienation, the numinous, psychological trauma, transcendence, the sublime or a fractured ideology; particularly, it can be a narrative that separates signifiers from conscious desire-quest (i.e., narcissistic injury).

Jouissance

Julia Kristeva, particularly in her 1980 essay Powers of Horror, posits that the super-ego's abjection facilitates a subjective traumatic limit between subject and objects, with the Real, through ego-object loss and castration of surplus jouissance. Hurst references Žižek: for any event that converges on a collapsed Symbolic Order, is a where Antigone becomes the Thing. Lacanian Being-for-death is a death drive for its telos (i.e., sublimity).

Unreal vs real(2)

The unreal-unnameable organ called a lamella (or libido as a symbiotic, pre-Oedipal, pre-symbolic Real(1) before-signified-who-ness) is distinct from the Real(2) after-signifier-what-ness, which a subject experiences at the limits of the Imaginary and Symbolic. Real(1) is a continuous, "whole" reality that is undivided by language, while Real(2) is the space of the possibility of abjection being raised wherever there is interference in the path of the object of the ego, including the experience of surplus jouissance which threatens to surpass a subject's boundaries; Kristeva remarks that this experience "takes the ego back to its source".

Somatization

Malcolm Bowie interprets the Lacanian real as ineffable (i.e., uncanny).

Historical materialism

Fredric Jameson interprets Lacan's real through a Marxist-Hegelian lens as meaning "History itself", a narrative symptom of the event.

In afro-pessimism

Marriott examines Fanon: white people's gaze and dehumanization of black people through objectification, creating a desire for the absent object-of-identity in marginalized individuals that is destroyed through racist signification. George states that race is an objet a confrontation with jouissance and lack. George posits that the history of slavery in the United States and racism are within the Real (e.g., Beloved). Crockett references W. E. B. Du Bois in relation to a Real critique of the Symbolic through a point of view from the angle of double consciousness.

Sinthome

In practice, Lacanian psychoanalysis derives the event by gazing at the resistance and transference to identify the automaton mechanisms of the Thing (viz., foreclosure, repression, and disavowal) that are utilized to anamorphosically read where the signifiers are hiding the symptomatic objet petit (a), rendering the real subject.

Subject-as-metaphor

The void is what the subject finds through interrogation of oneself. The subject existentially navigates an inward, metaphorical and vacuous desert or ocean, unguided by the psychoanalytic metaphor of God's "Original Presence". Premodern philosophers also thought up a formless chora, a pre-universal "chaos", and the experience of horror vacui; these conceptions of an unguided ego confronting the void informed psychoanalysis. It prefigured Lacan's outline of how the subject-as-metaphor, later the analysand, encounters the Real and how this experience is slated in analysis to give rise to pathologies, particularly anxieties and traumas. In psychoanalysis, the subject appears either as transference, repression or as the barrier separating the signifier over the signified. Subjective experience is a paradoxical extension inseparable from the experience of place, landscape, and body, which can be conveyed as utopia, dystopia, or pantheon.

Philosophers reveal the Real engulfing the ego in a comparatively unfamiliar and defamiliarizing space, and the subject's dystonic feelings of confrontation. The geographical self as described in human geography, or alternatively the "makanthropos" as described by Schopenhauer, feels Cartesian anxiety, a confusion of certainty in reason, from the experience of this formless void.

Resistance

An impasse is the resistance between the real and the imaginary that affects the therapeutic alliance, wherein the client is at odds with the Transcendent Function of the therapist's mind as mediation to the Symbolic Order by way of the Signifier-as-God (i.e., discrepancy). Analysis reveals the kernel at the core of the Real through resistance. The finite ego resists the unconscious's infinite lattice of signifiers.

Passe

Lacan gave the name passe to the analysand's dualistic experience of uncertainty, becoming eclipsed and challenged by a subjective confrontation, that gives way to a feeling of certainty with the Real, e.g. in the temptation of Christ or the desolation of saints; it is "the moment of crisis in a speaking cure in which all subjectivity, the last imaginary residue [of the ego], all self-love falls away" and is replaced by acceptance from the analyst.

Michael Eigen states that a paradox of faith comes from subject-attacking-object (such as in Jung's Answer to Job). The Real, as analogized as an aporia in experience or an encompassing black hole of reality, relates to the Jungian archetype of the Death Mother, the shadow of the Mother archetype, articulated in Neumann's The Great Mother.

The becoming produced under therapy sessions can lead to an ineffable and oceanic experience of the Thing (White interpreting Bion, Eigen, Ogden); the analyst in the Bion school seeks to be an empty container, or empty subject of the void, of the client's projections.

Interpretations of the real

With Muller, psychosis has no word-thing symbolic mediation: figurative communications function as reified Real objects (e.g., projective identification and bizarre objects). Marriott states that foreclosure is directly connected to ressentiment. Brenner cites Laurent, claiming autistic foreclosure leads to Real castration through manifesting a synthetic mOther (The Death of the Author or barring the subject), as opposed to Symbolic castration within an organic nomos; this existential crisis could theoretically lead to the emergence of a schizoid personality style (dissociation, isolation, and intellectualization); q.v., enantiodromia. Under autistic foreclosure, the autistic subject is un-barred, wherein the signifier feels Real (q.v., synesthesia).

Leeb conjectures that Theodor W. Adorno's concept of the non-identical and Lacan's Real fall under immanent critique.

In schizoanalysis

In critical overviews of the work of Gilles Deleuze and Félix Guattari, the Real has been identified, particularly in readings of A Thousand Plateaus, as the plane of defamiliarized and deterritorialized empty signifiers that approach the uncanny valley, destroyed signs of an imploding gaze, and a-temporal semiotic black holes of faciality. In both the construction and destruction of the "face", a system that "brings together a despotic wall of interconnected signifiers and passional black holes of subjective absorption", there is a split in subjectivity and a confrontation with the Real. The uncanny, the plane of empty signifiers, is found in relations between intersections of the interior-self and exterior-Other, a "return of the repressed" as an eternal return of the path of the objet petit a that disturbs familiarity and further deterritorializes the subject.

Guattari, who throughout the development of his philosophy was critical of Lacan, wrote in the 1979 essay "Logos or Abstract Machines?" that:

When the monad-soul finds inner stability, the autopoietic objet petit a does not lead to introjection (oral stage) nor projection (anal stage): this state is the body without organs, a virtuality of becoming within the plane of immanence. The real is a diagrammatic virtuality of reality (or Nature), onticly surpassing all regimes of signs by the merging of content and expression in the body without organs.

Modalities of the real in Žižek

Slavoj Žižek divides the gist of the Lacanian Real into "three modalities":<ref>{{cite journal
| last1      = Luque
| first1     = Juan Luis Pérez de
| date       = 2013
| title      = Lovecraft, Reality, and the Real: A Žižekian Approach
| url        = A Žižekian Approach
| journal    = Lovecraft Annual
| issue      = 7
| pages      = 187–203
| jstor = 26868476
| access-date = 2022-01-16
| quote      = Žižek...divides the Real into three different categories, which coincide with the imaginary/real/symbolic division: 'There are thus THREE modalities[...]the 'real Real'[...]'symbolic Real'[...]'imaginary Real'[...]On Belief 82’’}}</ref>

 The "symbolic Real" (Phallus): signifier of signification, Lacan's impossible "Other of the Other"
 symbolic historicity (Clotho) perpetually quilting the chain of signifiers (Lachesis) with a new master signifier (Atropos); i.e., dialectically ideological narrative-punctuation (hermeneutic circle/monad): when kairos castrates the logos with the Real.

 The "imaginary Real" (Objet petit a): Lewis states that real-traces of each signifier are rendered intelligible through the no-image signified
 a parallax-ic ego-split, deriving an ego-ideal object (a '), creating a poetic-real mental image of horror and terror, deriving the uncanny: méconnaissance.

 The "real Real" (Event): a semiotic negative-image object (e.g., woodblock printing), neither symbolic signifier nor imaginary signified
 a fissure of the Symbolic; an absence-of-absence (~~p); a reified psychological projection, sublimated as a Thing (viz., transference-object, analysand, identification, and nondualism).

Lewis states that the real-of-the-symbolic is the letter (referenced in Lacan's schemas), and the real-of-the-imaginary is objet petit a.

Žižek cites, as literary examples of the Real which he identifies as "the primordial abyss which swallows everything, dissolving all identities", the eldritch experience of Pip in the ocean in Herman Melville's Moby-Dick, regression and the repetition compulsion of characterological desire in death drive within Poe's Maelström, and the climax of Joseph Conrad's Heart of Darkness where Kurtz is in the throes of death. Meanwhile, in his use of film analysis, Žižek states that the real Real can be found in The Full Monty and surreptitiously in The Sound of Music''.

Glyn Daly also provided a further elaboration of Žižek's three modalities through his pre-established examples from pop culture:
The real Real is the hard limit that functions as the horrifying Thing (the Alien, Medusa's head, maelstrom and so on) - a shattering force of negation. The symbolic Real refers to the anonymous symbols and codes (scientific formulae, digitalisation, empty signifiers...) that function in an indifferent manner as the abstract "texture" onto which, or out of which, reality is constituted. In The Matrix, for example, the symbolic Real is given expression at the point where Neo perceives "reality" in terms of the abstract streams of digital output. In the contemporary world, Žižek argues that it is capital itself that provides this essential backdrop to our reality and as such represents the symbolic Real of our age. With the "imaginary real" we have precisely the (unsustainable) dimension of fantasmatic excess-negation that is explored in Flatliners. This is why cyberspace is such an ambiguous imaginary realm.

Notable figures

See also

Notes

Further reading

External links
Chronology of Jacques Lacan
The Seminars of Jacques Lacan
An Introductory Dictionary of Lacanian Psychoanalysis - Dylan Evans

Psychoanalytic terminology
Jacques Lacan
Post-structuralism
Structuralism